is a Japanese superhero manga series written and illustrated by Yōkō Akiyama. It is a spin-off to Kōhei Horikoshi's popular manga series My Hero Academia. It was serialized in Shueisha's Saikyō Jump in July 2019, with its chapters, which are released on a monthly basis, additionally collected into four tankōbon volumes as of October 2022.


Premise 

My Hero Academia: Team-Up Missions follows Izuku Midoriya and the rest of his classmates at U.A. High School as they are paired up with students from other hero schools and even Pro Heroes to participate in specially-requested missions as part of the "Team-Up Missions Program".

Publication 

Written and illustrated by Yōkō Akiyama, My Hero Academia: Team-Up Missions began serialization in Shueisha's Saikyō Jump on August 2, 2019, with a prologue chapter debuting in Jump GIGA on March 4, 2019. Shueisha has collected its chapters into individual tankōbon volumes. The first volume was released on March 4, 2020. As of October 4, 2022, four volumes have been released. In July 2020, Viz Media announced that My Hero Academia: Team-Up Missions would be licensed for the English-language release in North America.

Reception 
In a review of the first volume, Alex Lukas of Comic Book Resources stated that My Hero Academia: Team-Up Missions "is a decent popcorn read, [but] fails to be a fresh take on the young heroes of U.A. High School", although he commented the premise has "undeniable" potential.

References 

2019 manga
Comics spin-offs
My Hero Academia
Shueisha manga
Shōnen manga
Superheroes in anime and manga
Viz Media manga